Halik sa Apoy (International title: Fiery Kiss / ) is a Philippine television drama romance series broadcast by GMA Network. Directed by Jay Altajeros, it stars Carmina Villarroel, Ynez Veneracion and Bobby Andrews. It premiered on August 10, 1998. The series concluded on February 26, 1999 with a total of 145 episodes.

Cast and characters
Lead cast
 Carmina Villarroel as Alyssa Lambino
 Ynez Veneracion as Maricar
 Bobby Andrews as Carlo

Supporting cast
 Celia Rodriguez as Tuding
 Tirso Cruz III as Benjamin Rosales
 Kim Delos Santos as Mylene
 Dino Guevarra as Jilmer
 Jake Roxas as Benj
 Jay Manalo as Jonas
 Ciara Sotto as Adelle
 Marianne dela Riva as Lorreine

Recurring cast
 Daria Ramirez as Trining
 Rachel Alejandro as Maxine
 Mariel Lopez as Alexis
 Dexter Doria as Cora
 Maria Isabel Lopez as Marta
 Katya Santos as Shiela
 Timmy Cruz as Toyang 
 Eula Valdez as Delia 
 Tanya Gomez as Mameng
 Teresa Loyzaga as Beatriz
 Polo Ravales as Ricky
 Joyce Jimenez as Trixie

References

External links
 

1998 Philippine television series debuts
1999 Philippine television series endings
Filipino-language television shows
GMA Network drama series
Philippine romance television series
Television series by Viva Television
Television shows set in the Philippines